Emiliano Zuleta Baquero was a Colombian vallenato composer, accordion player and singer, popularly known as El viejo Mile (The Old Mile). Zuleta was born on January 11, 1912, in La Jagua del Pilar, a small town of la Guajira; He died on October 30, 2005, in Valledupar (Cesar) from respiratory problems at age 93.

In 1938 he published his masterpiece La gota fría, a song that emerged from a musical controversy with Lorenzo Morales and that years later Carlos Vives and Julio Iglesias would interpret, turning the song into an international hit.

Compositions
La gota fría
Esta Carta
Carmen Díaz
El zorro
El robo
La pimientica
Con la misma fuerza
El indio Manuel María
El regreso de Carmen
Mis hijos
El piñal
La enfermedad de Emiliano
Villanueva
Las enfermeras
Mis pocos días
Doce palabras
La Pule
Mañanita De Invierno

References

1912 births
2005 deaths
Latin Grammy Award winners
Valledupar
20th-century Colombian male singers
Colombian accordionists
Latin music songwriters
Vallenato musicians
Respiratory disease deaths in Colombia